Asher ( ’Āšēr), in the Book of Genesis, was the last of the two sons of Jacob and Zilpah (Jacob's eighth son) and the founder of the Israelite Tribe of Asher.

Name
The text of the Torah states that the name of Asher means "happy" or "blessing", implying a derivation from the Hebrew term osher in two variations—beoshri (meaning in my good fortune), and ishsheruni, which some textual scholars who embrace the JEDP hypothesis attribute to different sources—one to the Yahwist and the other to the Elohist. The Bible states that at his birth Leah exclaimed, "Happy am I! for the daughters will call me happy: so she called his name Asher", meaning "happy" (Genesis 30:13). Some scholars argue that the name of Asher may have to do with a deity originally worshipped by the tribe, either Asherah, or Ashur, the chief Assyrian deity; the latter possibility is cognate with Asher.

Biblical narrative
Asher and his four sons and daughter settled in Canaan. On his deathbed, Jacob blesses Asher by saying that "his bread shall be fat, and he shall yield royal dainties" (Gen. 49:20).

Moses said of Asher: "May Asher be blessed above other sons; may he be esteemed by his brothers; may he bathe his feet in olive oil." (Deuteronomy 33:24). 

Asher was the eighth son of the patriarch Jacob and the traditional progenitor of the tribe Asher.

Asher is represented as the younger brother of Gad; these two being the sons of Zilpah, the handmaid of Leah (Genesis 35:26). The Biblical account shows Zilpah's status as a handmaid change to an actual wife of Jacob (Genesis 30:9). Her handmaid status is regarded by some biblical scholars as indicating that the authors saw the tribe of Asher as being not of entirely Israelite origin; scholars believe that Asher consisted of certain clans affiliated with portions of the Israelite tribal confederation, but which were never incorporated into the body politic.

The Torah states that Asher had four sons and one daughter, who were born in Canaan and migrated with him to Egypt, with their descendants remaining there until the Exodus; this seems to be partly contradicted by Egyptian records (assuming a late Exodus date), according to which a group named Aseru, a name from which Asher is probably derived, were, in the 14th century BC, living in a similar region to Asher's traditional territory, in Canaan. 
Asher's daughter, Serah (also transliterated as Serach), is the only granddaughter of Jacob mentioned in the Torah (Gen. 46:17). 

Her mother is not named. According to classical rabbinical literature, Serach's mother was named Hadurah, and was a descendant of Eber. Although Hadurah was a wife of Asher, it was her second marriage, and Serach's father was actually Hadurah's first husband, who had died. In classical rabbinical literature, Hadurah's marriage to Asher was his second marriage as well, his first having been to Adon, who was a descendant of Ishmael. The Book of Jubilees contradicts this, arguing instead that Asher's wife was named Ijon (which probably means dove).

Asher's sons were Jimnah, Ishuah, Isui, and Beriah.

In rabbinical literature
Asher was the very one whose endeavor it had always been to reconcile the brothers, especially when they disputed as to who among them was destined to be the ancestor of the priests (Sifre, Deut. 355). In the Test. Patr., Asher, 5, Asher is regarded as the example of a virtuous man who with singlemindedness strives only for the general good. According to classical rabbinical literature, Asher had informed his brothers about Reuben's incest with Bilhah. As a result Asher came to be on bad terms with his brothers. Once Reuben confessed, the brothers realised they had been unjust towards Asher. Asher's motivation is described, by classical rabbinical sources, as being entirely innocent of evil intent, and always in search of harmony between his brothers. 

Asher was born on 20 Shevat 2199 (1562 BCE). According to some accounts 2 Shevat is the date of his death.

Asher married twice. His first wife was Adon, a great-granddaughter of Ishmael; his second, Hadurah, a granddaughter of Eber and a widow. By her first marriage Hadurah had a daughter Serah, whom Asher treated as affectionately as if she had been of his own flesh and blood, so that the Bible itself speaks of Serah as Asher's daughter. According to the Book of Jubilees (34:20), Asher's wife was named "Iyon" (probably, "dove").

Asher's descendants in more than one regard deserved their name ("Asher" meaning "happiness"). The tribe of Asher was the one most blessed with male children; and its women were so beautiful that priests and princes sought them in marriage. The abundance of oil in the land possessed by Asher so enriched the tribe that none of them needed to hire a habitation. The soil was so fertile that in times of scarcity, and especially in the Sabbatical year, Asher provided all Israel with olive-oil. The Asherites were also renowned for wisdom.

Scholarly interpretations
A number of scholars have proposed that the tribe of Asher actually originated as the Weshesh group of Sea Peoples—the name Weshesh (or rather Uashesh/Ueshesh—for easy pronunciation, this is usually transcribed into English as Weshesh) can be decomposed as men of Uash in Hebrew, and hence possibly a corruption of Asher.

Tomb 
A Samaritan tradition recorded in the late 19th century considered Neby Toba near Tubas to be the burial place of Asher.

References

External links

Founders of biblical tribes
Children of Jacob
Book of Genesis people
Book of Jubilees